Alvin Cruz (born April 24, 1982) is a professional basketball player who played for the Niagara University men's university basketball team from 2001 to 2005. He is currently playing in the Baloncesto Superior Nacional for the Grises de Humacao. Born in San Juan, Puerto Rico, Cruz played with the Puerto Rico U21 National Team-01 and Puerto Rico National Team-05 as well as in several different professional teams overseas.

Early years
Cruz was born in San Juan, Puerto Rico.  He attended Florida Air Academy in Melbourne, Florida, a private military academy, and played high school basketball for the Florida Air Falcons.  The Falcons won state championship while undefeated during his senior season.

Career Highs
Alvin is #2 on the all time assist list at Niagara University with 630 assists.
Alvin is one of the top 50 players in the all time assist list in the Baloncesto Superior Nacional. In 2020, he set a new career record in assists with a 5.8 average, while also being the top leader in a/e (assists per errors) for the season.

Awarded Guard of the Year in 2018 at the Professional Basketball League in Panama for averaging 18.9 ppg, 4.8 rebounds and 4.9 assists.

Professional career

After playing for the Niagara Purple Eagles in college, Cruz performed as a professional basketball player overseas in Europe and Mexico. In 2008, he started for the Soproni sÖrdögök in the Hungary-A Division where he averaged 17.6 ppg.

Since 2006 he has played and started for eight teams in the Puerto Rican professional basketball league Baloncesto Superior Nacional. He played for the Capitanes de Arecibo from 2014 to 2017, reaching the league finals on 4 seasons and winning the championship in 2016.  In 2018, he was playing for the Cariduros de Fajardo, and received an Honorable Mention in the BSN. He played for the Caballos de Coclé in the Professional Basketball League in Panama and in 2018 was awarded Guard of the Year. 

He played in the FIBA Americas League representing Puerto Rico and Arecibo from 2014 to 2017.

External links
https://basketball.latinbasket.com/team/Puerto-Rico/Grises-de-Humacao/2808
http://basketball.latinbasket.com/player/Alvin-Cruz/Puerto-Rico/Capitanes-de-Arecibo/25619
http://basketball.latinbasket.com/team/Puerto-Rico/Capitanes-de-Arecibo/2187
https://www.sports-reference.com/cbb/players/alvin-cruz-1.html
http://www.maxpreps.com/playoffs/brackets.aspx?gendersport=boys,basketball&state=fl
https://basketball.latinbasket.com/team/Panama/Caballos-de-Cocle-Aguadulce/20846
https://www.latinbasket.com/Panama/news/554868/Latinbasket.com-All-Panamanian-LPB-Clausura-Awards-2018
https://bsnpr.com/jugadores/jugador.asp?id=74&e=1

1981 births
Living people
Baloncesto Superior Nacional players
Leones de Ponce basketball players
Niagara Purple Eagles men's basketball players
Piratas de Quebradillas players
Point guards
Puerto Rican men's basketball players
Science City Jena players
Soproni KC players
Sportspeople from San Juan, Puerto Rico
Turów Zgorzelec players